New Jersey's 11th Legislative District is one of 40 in the New Jersey Legislature, covering the Monmouth County municipalities of Allenhurst Borough, Asbury Park City, Colts Neck Township, Deal Borough, Eatontown Borough, Freehold Borough, Freehold Township, Interlaken Borough, Loch Arbour Village, Long Branch City, Neptune City Borough, Neptune Township, Ocean Township, Red Bank Borough, Shrewsbury Borough, Shrewsbury Township, Tinton Falls Borough and West Long Branch Borough as of the 2011 apportionment.

Demographic characteristics
As of the 2020 United States census, the district had a population of 227,063, of whom 182,117 (80.2%) were of voting age. The racial makeup of the district was 139,463 (61.4%) White, 29,418 (13.0%) African American, 1,574 (0.7%) Native American, 9,695 (4.3%) Asian, 71 (0.0%) Pacific Islander, 24,487 (10.8%) from some other race, and 22,355 (9.8%) from two or more races. Hispanic or Latino of any race were 42,924 (18.9%) of the population.

The district had 160,507 registered voters as of December 1, 2021, of whom 63,269 (39.4%) were registered as unaffiliated, 55,316 (34.5%) were registered as Democrats, 39,736 (24.8%) were registered as Republicans, and 2,186 (1.4%) were registered to other parties.

Political representation
For the 2022–2023 session, the district is represented in the New Jersey Senate by Vin Gopal (D, Long Branch) and in the General Assembly by Kimberly Eulner (R, Shrewsbury) and Marilyn Piperno (R, Colts Neck Township).

The legislative district overlaps with  New Jersey's 3rd,  New Jersey's 4th, and 6th congressional districts.

1965–1973
In the interim period between the 1964 Supreme Court decision Reynolds v. Sims which required the creation of state legislature districts to be made as equal in population as possible, and the 1973 creation of the 40-district map, the 11th District consisted of all of Essex County. Because of its large population, the 11th Senate District elected multiple people to the State Senate at-large. It was further divided into six Assembly districts in 1967 and 1969, and five in 1971; in all cases, each district elected two people to serve in the General Assembly.

The members elected to the Senate from this district are as follows:

The members elected to the General Assembly from the 11th Senate District are as follows:

District composition since 1973
When the 40-district state legislature apportionment was created in 1973, the 11th District consisted of central Monmouth County suburban townships including Freehold (and the borough of the same name), Howell, Colts Neck, Manalapan, Marlboro, Holmdel, and Hazlet with a spur from Tinton Falls (then called New Shrewsbury) to Sea Bright, and continuing up the Atlantic coastline to Highlands and Atlantic Highlands. In the 1981 redistricting, the district hugged the Monmouth County municipalities along the coastline from Manasquan to Atlantic Highlands inclusive of other inland townships and boroughs including Wall Township, Neptune Township, Ocean Township, and Oceanport. The 1990s iteration of the district remained largely the same with the exception of coastline municipalities south of South Belmar shifting to the 10th and the addition of Eatontown, Fair Haven, Rumson, and West Long Branch. Following the 2001 redistricting, most of the boroughs shifted to the 10th in the 1991 redistricting returned to the 11th (with the exception of Manasquan) while Fair Haven and Oceanport were shifted to the 12th.

Described by NJ.com as "perhaps the biggest upset of the night", Republican Jennifer Beck lost her bid for re-election to the Senate in 2017 to Democratic challenger Vin Gopal, in what was the third-most expensive of the 120 legislative races statewide, with total spending in excess of $4 million. The district had been represented only by Republicans since 1992. With the addition of heavily Democratic communities like Asbury Park in the 2011 apportionment, Democrats gained a 32%-23% margin over Republicans in numbers of registered voters. Democrats Joann Downey and Eric Houghtaling won the two Assembly seats in 2015 and Gopal's 2017 win over Beck, combined with holds by Assembly incumbents Downey and Houghtaling, put all three District 11 seats in the hands of Democrats.

Election history

Election results, 1973–present

Senate

General Assembly

Election results, 1965–1973

Senate

General Assembly

District 11A

District 11B

District 11C

District 11D

District 11E

District 11F

References

Monmouth County, New Jersey
11